The Saryu class of offshore patrol vessels (OPV) are advanced patrol ships of the Indian Navy built at the Goa Shipyard Limited. These vessels are capable of ocean surveillance and monitoring and can maintain control of shipping lanes. They can also be deployed to provide security to offshore oil installations, and other naval assets.

Design and development
Saryu class was derived from Sankalp-class vessels built for the Indian Coast Guard. The vessels are powered by two Pielstick diesel engines rated at a combined , each driving a Wärtsilä WCP 5C10 controllable-pitch propeller through a reduction gearbox.

Ships of the class 
The first ship,  was launched on 30 March 2009 in the presence of Chief of the Naval Staff, Admiral Sureesh Mehta. INS Saryu was handed over to the Navy on 21 December 2012 and was commissioned on 21 January 2013 at Vasco da Gama, by the Commander-in-Chief of Andaman and Nicobar Command, Air Marshal P K Roy.

The second ship, INS Sunayna, was handed over to the Indian Navy on 2 September 2013; her first CO was to be Cdr Aftab Ahmed Khan. The three remaining ships were delivered subsequently with an interval of six months each. INS Sumitra, the fourth and last OPV, was delivered to the Navy by GSL on 16 July 2014. Two ships were delivered to Sri Lankan Navy in 2017 and 2018.

Operators

Gallery

See also
List of active Indian Navy ships
List of Sri Lanka Navy equipment

References

External links 
 
 Saryu Class Offshore Patrol Vessel
 Images from INS Saryu launch ceremony
 Graphical Image of NPOV

Patrol vessels of the Indian Navy
Patrol ship classes
Ships built in India
Saryu-class patrol vessels